Carlos Samuel Blixen Abella (27 December 1936 – 1 August 2022) was an Uruguayan basketball player, who won the bronze medal with the men's national team at the 1956 Summer Olympics in Melbourne, Australia. Four years later he once again competed in the Olympics.

References

External links

1936 births
2022 deaths
Sportspeople from Montevideo
Uruguayan people of Swedish descent
Basketball players at the 1956 Summer Olympics
Basketball players at the 1960 Summer Olympics
Basketball players at the 1963 Pan American Games
Olympic basketball players of Uruguay
Olympic bronze medalists for Uruguay
Uruguayan men's basketball players
1959 FIBA World Championship players
1963 FIBA World Championship players
Uruguayan people of German descent
Olympic medalists in basketball
Pan American Games competitors for Uruguay
Medalists at the 1956 Summer Olympics